The Kawasaki KX100 is a two-stroke motorcycle made by Kawasaki, positioned between the 85 cc and the 125 cc classes, with 19 inch front and 16 inch rear wheels, compared to 17-inch/16-inch typical of the 85 cc motocross bikes. Longer travel suspension and larger bore size main differences between these bikes which otherwise are the same.
 
The KX100 can be raced in dedicated 100cc motocross classes, or open minicycle classes, such as Supermini in Canada, which allows up to 150cc 4-strokes and 85cc-112cc 2-strokes as of 2007. The KX100 can sometimes be raced in the 125cc class however, 100cc bikes are not very common.

References
2https://www.kawasaki.com/en-us/motorcycle/kx/kx-youth-mx/kx-100/2021-kx100?cm_re=MPP-_-KX%E2%84%A2100:MODELS-_-VIEWSPECSDETAILS

KX100
Off-road motorcycles